Graydon Creed is a fictional character appearing in American comic books published by Marvel Comics. The character was created by writer Scott Lobdell and artist Brandon Peterson and first appeared in The Uncanny X-Men #299 (April 1993). He is the "baseline human" son of Sabretooth and Mystique.

Fictional character biography
Posing as German spy Leni Zauber, Mystique seduced freelance assassin Victor Creed (Sabretooth) while he was in Germany on a mission. Mystique later gave birth to a normal human child—Graydon—whom she gave up for adoption, although she kept an eye on him. When Graydon learned that he was the son of two mutants who had abandoned him as an inconvenience, he grew resentful of all mutants and that resentment coloured his outlook for the rest of his life.

In his adult years, Graydon formed a group called the Friends of Humanity, dedicated to opposing mutant civil rights by committing acts of terrorism against peaceful mutants and mutant sympathizers, and using the acts of violent mutants such as Magneto to rally support for their cause.

Upstarts
Creed also came to join the Upstarts, a group of wealthy and powerful individuals who had been brought together by Selene and the enigmatic telepathic Gamesmaster with the sole purpose of killing mutants for points in a twisted game. After learning of his parents' identities, Creed sought to kill them as part of the Upstarts' game. Disguised as the armored Tribune, Creed hired assassins to kill his mother and had his father implanted with a bomb. His father managed to remove the device and confronted his son, who callously stabbed Sabretooth's assistant, Birdy, a mutant telepath whom Sabretooth employed to keep his homicidal rages in check.

During the Upstarts' self-professed "Younghunt", Creed was blackmailed into revealing the location of the Upstarts' prisoners by the New Warriors, who threatened to expose Creed as a mutant collaborator and the son of mutants.

Death
Later, using the resources he had gained through the Friends of Humanity, and with the support of the government-sponsored anti-mutant taskforce, Operation: Zero Tolerance, Creed nominated himself as a presidential candidate and ran on an anti-mutant platform. Capitalizing on a near-hysterical fear of mutants in the general public (specially after the Onslaught debacle), Creed's popularity swelled, which led to the Daily Bugle newspaper launching an investigation into Creed's activities, on-principle. When a reporter from the Bugle obtained information regarding Creed's parentage, Zero Tolerance's leader, Bastion, killed the journalist to prevent the news from leaking out. Although they stopped the reporter, Creed did not manage to catch that the X-Men had also infiltrated his presidential campaign, by planting Bobby Drake (under the alias of "Drake Roberts") and Sam Guthrie (under the alias of "Samson Guthry") as Creed's assistants.

On the eve of the election, Creed was assassinated during a campaign speech when a plasma beam completely disintegrated him. Several years later, the miniseries, X-Men Forever, revealed that a future version of Mystique had fired the shot, having sworn to kill Graydon for his part in the Friends of Humanity's brutal attack on Trevor Chase, the grandson of her lover, Destiny.

Purifiers
The pages of X-Force show a group of Purifiers digging up the corpse of Graydon Creed, his body is then taken back to their base. It is re-animated by Bastion using the techno-organic virus taken from an "offspring" of Magus. Creed later went public with his return, claiming that his death was faked all along to allow him to go underground and avoid persecution from mutants.

During the Second Coming storyline, Graydon Creed, alongside Steven Lang, is killed by Hope Summers.

Hunt for Wolverine
During the "Hunt for Wolverine" storyline, Sabretooth, Lady Deathstrike, and Daken fight their way past the zombies and soldiers from Soteira Killteam Nine in order to get to the power station where the glowing green box suspected of causing the zombie outbreak is located. Sabretooth discovers that one of the soldiers is a zombie version of his son Graydon. After Lady Deathstrike and Daken are stabbed by a zombie version of Lord Dark Wind, Sabretooth fights his zombified son who states that there is 10 minutes left before Maybelle is burned to the ground. As Sabretooth continues his fight with Graydon, he tries to get answers on how Graydon came back from the dead. He doesn't get an answer. After slaying the zombie Lord Dark Wind, Lady Deathstrike stabs the zombie Graydon in the neck.

Other versions

Age of Apocalypse
Graydon Creed goes by the name "Horror Show" in the Age of Apocalypse reality. He's a part of the X-Terminated team with a handful of other humans. He's wearing an armor and appears to have a flamethrower and other firearms. He mentions that his father, Sabretooth, was apparently a brutal, abusive father. During the X-Termination crossover, AoA Nightcrawler's trip home resulted in the release of three evil beings that destroy anyone they touch. Several casualties resulted, including the AoA's Sabretooth, Horror Show, and Fiend, as well as the X-Treme X-Men's Xavier and Hercules.

Age of X
In the Age of X reality, Graydon Creed had led a strike force that put the mutant race on the verge of extinction.

House of M
After Magneto's takeover of Genosha during the House of M, Graydon Creed rose to prominence as an anti-mutant activist, becoming friends with vice-president Bolivar Trask. His prominence was short-lived as Magneto (who compared Graydon Creed to Adolf Hitler) viewed it as his duty to rid the world of the man. Magneto sent his assassin Sabretooth to kill him. Graydon Creed's massacred body was found by government agents, and Trask ordered his death ruled an accident to prevent panic.

Mutant X
In the Mutant X reality, Graydon Greed is still the son of Mystique and Sabretooth and the founder of the Friends of Humanity. He became President of the United States after Mister Fantastic went missing. Graydon also reinstated S.H.I.E.L.D. and promoted Nick Fury to General.

In other media

Television
Graydon Creed appeared in X-Men, voiced by John Stocker. As in the comics, Creed hates mutants because he is ashamed of being part mutant himself and because his parents, Mystique and Sabretooth, were abusive to him. Many years later, Graydon founded the Friends of Humanity (FOH), an anti-mutant hate group that sought to vilify mutants. After the Beast's pardon by the President, Graydon's resentment grew even more and the Friends of Humanity began targeting the X-Men. In the episode "Time Fugitives", he hires a scientist to create a virus that would wipe out the mutant race, but would be relatively harmless to ordinary humans. While giving a speech about the plague's effects, Graydon attempts to infect Beast with the virus but is stopped by Bishop. During the struggle, Graydon accidentally infects himself and retreats back to the lab for medical aid. The X-Men follow him, attack the base and the scientist reveals himself to be Apocalypse. The X-Men help him get clear of the battle. The X-Men destroy the virus and Graydon returns to the Friends of Humanity headquarters. In the episode "Beauty and the Beast", Beast begins dating a former patient, named Carly. The FOH protest outside the clinic, and later kidnap Carly. Beast begins searching for her and Wolverine, in an unusual act of patience, infiltrates the Friends of Humanity, pretending to be the victim of an assault by evil mutants. Graydon gladly accepts him into the fold. As they get to know each other, Wolverine begins to suspect that Graydon Creed is Sabretooth's son. An enraged Beast attacks the FOH headquarters and the X-Men use a holographic projector to display information on Sabretooth in front of the Friends of Humanity, including his real name (given in this episode as Graydon Creed Senior). Ruined, Graydon suffers a nervous breakdown as his followers abandon him. Creed spends months in a psychiatric hospital. Once he recovers, Graydon tries to return to the folds of the Friends of Humanity organization in the episode "Bloodlines". A council of masked men now rule over Friends of Humanity. However, after having been made aware of his having a mutant for a father, have been digging further into his past and uncovered that his family tree "bears much mutant/rotten fruit"; they declare that in order to lead the Friends of Humanity once more, he has to prove himself by killing Mystique (his birth mother) and Nightcrawler (his younger half-brother). Creed then kidnaps Mystique and sends Nightcrawler a letter, telling him that he must come to the Friends of Humanity base or they will kill his mother. Nightcrawler seeks the help of Rogue and Wolverine. They locate the base and walk straight into a trap. Graydon captures and tries to kill all of them, but the mutants break free and destroy the base with Creed's helicopter being washed away. Creed is recovered by four of the council members and bound. They state that he has failed for the last time and callously delivered via parachute to Sabretooth's cabin in the woods, who presumably tortures him.

 The character Duncan Matthews voiced by Vincent Gale in X-Men: Evolution greatly resembles Graydon Creed. He is depicted as a Bayville High jock who dated Jean Grey and a rival to Scott Summers/Cyclops. After the secret about mutants was revealed, he became more antagonistic, turning to hate crimes and assaulting mutants. His hatred for mutants grew to the point that he attempted to kill X-Man Evan Daniels/Spyke (Storm's nephew in the series) but was arrrested.

References

External links
 
 

Fictional murdered people
Characters created by Scott Lobdell
Comics characters introduced in 1993
Fictional cult leaders
Fictional presidents of the United States
Fictional undead
Marvel Comics male supervillains
Fictional terrorists